A number of steamships have been named Baltrader, including:

 , a cargo ship in service 1926–40
 , a cargo ship in service 1947–52

Ship names